Kiwanuka is the third studio album by English singer-songwriter Michael Kiwanuka. It was released on 1 November 2019 through Polydor and Interscope Records. The album won the 2020 Mercury Prize, and was nominated for Best Rock Album at the 63rd Grammy Awards.
The opening title track to this album was used by broadcaster ITV as its theme tune for its coverage of the Men's Football Euros 2020.

Critical reception

On the review aggregator website Metacritic, Kiwanuka has a score of 89 out of 100 based on 21 reviews, indicating "universal acclaim". Aggregator AnyDecentMusic? gave it 8.5 out of 10, based on their assessment of the critical consensus.

Dave Simpson of The Guardian hailed Kiwanuka as a "bold, expansive, heartfelt, sublime album" and one of the best of the decade, while Dorian Lynskey of Q called it a "compassionate, career-defining masterpiece". In her review for NME, Elizabeth Aubrey highlighted the personal nature of its lyrics, commending it as "a daring leap of self-affirmation." Neil McCormick of The Daily Telegraph described it as "an album in which a troubled spirit seeks the relief of music to mesmerising and charged effect." In a year-end essay for Slate, Ann Powers cited Kiwanuka as proof that the format is not dead but rather undergoing a "metamorphosis", with artists such as Kiwanuka utilizing the concept album through the culturally-relevant autobiographical narratives, which in this case is a "song cycle alchemizing violence through compassion".

The album won the Mercury Prize 2020. It was the third time in his career he had been nominated following nominations for Home Again and Love & Hate but the first time he had won.

Accolades

Track listing

Personnel 
Credits adapted from digital liner notes.

Musicians

 Michael Kiwanuka – vocals , acoustic guitar , bass , percussion , electric guitar , keyboards , organ , piano , synthesizer 
 Inflo – background vocals , drums , electric guitar , percussion , piano , vocals , organ , synthesizer , keyboards , programming 
 Rosie Danvers – cello 
 Kadeem Clarke – keyboards , synthesizer , piano , Wurlitzer electric piano 
 Danger Mouse – percussion and tambourine , electric guitar , programming , keyboards 
 Nick Barr – viola 
 Natalia Bonner – violin 
 Zara Benyounes – violin 
 Alecia Chakour – background vocals 
 James Casey – background vocals 
 Dizzy Daniel Moorehead – saxophone 
 Jasmine Muhammed – background vocals 
 LaDonna Harley Peters – background vocals 
 Paul Boldeau – background vocals 
 Saundra Williams – background vocals 
 Yolanda Greaves – background vocals 
 Bruce White – viola 
 Anna Croad – violin 
 Patrick Kiernan – violin 
 Sally Jackson – violin 
 Stephanie Cavey – violin 
 Steve Morris – violin 
 Bryony James – cello 
 Richard Pryce – double bass 
 Jean Kelly – harp 
 Emma Owens – viola 
 Fiona Leggat – viola 
 Deborah Widdup – violin 
 Eleanor Mathieson – violin 
 Ellie Stanford – violin 
 Gillon Cameron – violin 
 Hayley Pomfrett – violin 
 Helen Hathorn – violin 
 Kotono Sato – violin 
 Chloe Vincent – flute 
 Nathan Allen – percussion 
 George Hogg – trumpet 
 Jenny Sacha – violin 
 Sarah Sexton – violin 

Technical

 Danger Mouse – producer
 Inflo – producer , mixer , recording engineer  
 Matt Colton – mastering engineer
 Richard Woodcraft – mixer , assistant recording engineer , vocal engineer , recording engineer 
 Kennie Takahashi – recording engineer , mixer 
 Tom Campbell – recording engineer , assistant recording engineer

Charts

Weekly charts

Year-end charts

Certifications

References

2019 albums
Michael Kiwanuka albums
Interscope Records albums
Mercury Prize-winning albums
Albums produced by Danger Mouse (musician)
Albums produced by Inflo